Elaeatis or Elaiatis is the name of a district of ancient Epirus about the mouth of the Acheron river. The district is mentioned by Thucydides. Its chief town was Elaea.

References
 Smith, William (editor); Dictionary of Greek and Roman Geography, "Acheron", London, (1854)

Geography of ancient Epirus